The Magdalena rat (Xenomys nelsoni) is a species of rodent in the family Cricetidae which is found only in a small region of western Mexico.

It is the only species in the genus Xenomys. The common name comes from the village where the first specimen was collected, and the second part of the scientific name refers to the collector.

Description
The general body colour is cinnamon to yellowish brown, being paler on the head and fading to creamy white on the underparts. It can be distinguished from other local rat-like species by the presence of white spots above the eyes and behind the ears; the cheeks are also marked with white fur. The tail is both hairy and scaly, and is dark brown in colour.

Distribution and habitat
The species is endemic to Colima and southwest Jalisco, along the Pacific coast of Mexico. There are no recognised subspecies.

Biology and behaviour
The species is arboreal and nocturnal. They spend the day sleeping in spherical nests constructed in tree hollows. The nests are lined with grass and kapok fruit fibres. They also use specific latrines, either in tree hollows or at the forks of branches. They breed between late May and November, and give birth to one or two young at a time.

An endangered species, it is threatened by habitat destruction and fragmentation due to deforestation and development. It is known from only three localities, and is believed to have a very low, and declining, population.

References

Neotominae
Endemic mammals of Mexico
Mammals described in 1892
Taxonomy articles created by Polbot
Jalisco dry forests